The Lotidae are a family of cod-like fishes commonly known as lings or rocklings.  They are found in the Arctic, Atlantic, and Pacific Oceans. Except for a few species of Gaidropsarus, all are restricted to the Northern Hemisphere. All species are marine, except for the burbot, Lota lota, found in rivers and lakes in northern Europe, Siberia, and North America. They are important commercial and game fish species.

References

 
Ray-finned fish families
Taxa named by Charles Lucien Bonaparte